Pe with descender (Ԥ ԥ; italics: Ԥ ԥ) is a letter of the Cyrillic script.

In modern Runet culture

This letter can be a euphemism for the obscene word "пиздец" (a total disaster, failure). It is basically a contraction of the letters П and Ц, the first and the last letters of the word.

Related letters and other similar characters
П п : Cyrillic letter Pe
Ҧ ҧ : Cyrillic letter Pe with middle hook

Computing codes

See also
Cyrillic characters in Unicode

Notes

External links 
ISO/IEC JTC1/SC2/WG2 N3435R
http://www.unicode.org/charts/PDF/U0500.pdf
PT Sans and PT Serif fonts
Deja Vu fonts

Cyrillic letters with diacritics
Letters with descender (diacritic)